Liberty Township is a township in Coffey County, Kansas, United States. As of the 2000 census, its population was 634.

Geography
According to the USGS, it contains four cemeteries: Apostolic, Fairhope, Gridley and Teachout.

The streams of Dinner Creek and Varvel Creek run through this township.

References
 USGS Geographic Names Information System (GNIS)

External links
 US-Counties.com
 City-Data.com

Townships in Coffey County, Kansas
Townships in Kansas